The La Mesa Fire was a 1977 wildfire on the Pajarito Plateau of New Mexico, in the Southwestern United States.

History
The fire was human-caused (likely a spark from a motorcycle) on the afternoon of 16 June 1977, in Los Alamos County.  Before it was contained one week later, the fire burned 15,444 acres (62.5 km²) of Bandelier National Monument and part of the Los Alamos National Laboratory, where it reached K-site and S-site, two facilities used to fabricate and test chemical explosives.  

Resources deployed to contain the fire included 1370 personnel, 9 bulldozers, 23 ground engines, 5 air tankers and 5 helicopters. One human life was lost when a firefighter suffered a massive heart attack while fleeing the first major blowup of the La Mesa Fire.  A monument near the entrance to Bandelier National Monument honors his memory.   A group of 27 high-school students were rescued after becoming trapped in the backcountry of Bandelier National Monument.  

The La Mesa fire burned around 60% of the drainage basin of Rio de Los Frijoles, a tributary of the Rio Grande, and increased awareness of the contribution of wildfire to severe erosion.  The La Mesa fire was significant for stimulating scientific study of the effects of fire on ecosystems.

Other Pajarito Plateau wildfires
La Mesa Fire is one of several major wildfires in the recent history of the Pajarito Plateau:
 1954 Water Canyon Fire
 1977 La Mesa Fire
 1996 Dome Fire
 1998 Oso Complex Fire
 2000 Cerro Grande Fire
 2011 Las Conchas Fire

See also

References 

 Jemez Mountains Fire History
 A Wake-up Call: Cerro Grande fire

1970s wildfires in the United States
1977 fires in the United States
1977 in New Mexico
June 1977 events in the United States
1977 natural disasters in the United States
History of Los Alamos County, New Mexico
Los Alamos National Laboratory
Wildfires in New Mexico